The Constitution of the Republic of Slovenia is the fundamental law of the Republic of Slovenia.

Writing and amendments
Preparation of the document began in August 1987 in the Slovene Writers' Association, and after the DEMOS coalition won the majority in the Assembly of the Socialist Republic of Slovenia in April 1990, continued in the Assembly. The large part of the work was completed at Podvin Castle near Radovljica in August 1990 under the leadership of the lawyer Peter Jambrek. The Constitution was adopted by the National Assembly of the Republic of Slovenia on 23 December 1991.

Since its proclamation, the Constitution has been amended seven times, with four major amendments:
 In July 1997, the Spanish compromise legalised selling of real estate to foreigners as part of the convergence with the European Union.
 In July 2000, the proportional voting system was entered directly in constitution to avoid legal gap that threatened to happen after the National Assembly didn't approve the law about this issue according to somewhat unclear referendum results: three voting systems were proposed to people but none of them won the absolute majority of voters. In a disputed decision, the Constitutional Court of Slovenia ruled that if any law is to be passed, it is to be the law according to the option that got relative majority. In the political events that followed the time was running out and changing the constitution seemed like a good escape from status quo.
 In March 2003, the constitutional amendment was passed that enabled for the transmission of certain legal powers to international organisations. This would allow Slovenia to enter the European Union and NATO if it be the will of the people. A referendum on such was held on 23 March 2003.
 In June 2006, three articles of the constitution were amended to clarify the definition of Public Authority, to clarify transfer of state functions to municipal authorities, and to clarify how regions are established and authorized to carry out state functions. , these have not yet been established.

Contents
The document is divided into ten chapters:

 General Provisions
 Human Rights and Fundamental Freedoms
 Economic and Social Relations
 Organisation of the State (under this provision, two of the seats in the National Assembly are reserved, one each to members of the country's Italian and Hungarian national communities)
 Self-Government
 Public Finance
 Constitutionality and Legality
 The Constitutional Court
 Procedure for Amending the Constitution
 Transitional and Final Provisions

References

External links 

 Constitution of Slovenia - English translation
 Ustava Republike Slovenije - in Slovene
 Constitutional Acts Amending the Constitution of the Republic of Slovenia - English
 As a Cartoon - in Slovene

Slovenia
Politics of Slovenia
1991 in law
Government of Slovenia
Law of Slovenia
Political history of Slovenia
1991 in Slovenia
1991 in politics
1991 documents